Kakameganula is a monotypic genus of east African jumping spiders containing the single species, Kakameganula holmi. The genus was first described by Angelika Dawidowicz & Wanda Wesołowska in 2016 under the name "Kakamega", and was placed in subtribe Thiratoscirtina within the tribe Aelurillini of the Salticoida clade of Salticinae.

In 2020, it was discovered that the name was already in use for the bird genus, Kakamega de Mann, Burton & Lennerstedt, 1978, and Kakameganula was published as a replacement name.

See also
 Kakamega
 List of Salticidae genera

References

Monotypic Salticidae genera
Arthropods of Kenya
Taxa named by Wanda Wesołowska